All the Love may refer to:

 All the Love (album), 2001 album by Oleta Adams
 All the Love All the Hate (Part One: All the Love), 1989 album by Christian Death
 "All the Love" (song), song by The Outfield 
"All the Love", song by Kate Bush from the album The Dreaming